The 2008–09 Armenian Hockey League season was the eighth season of the Armenian Hockey League, the top level of ice hockey in Armenia. Five teams participated in the league, and Urartu Yerevan won the championship.

Regular season

Final
Urartu Yerevan - Dinamo Yerevan (5-3, 6-2, 4-3)

External links
 Season on hockeyarchives.ru

Armenian Hockey League
2008 in Armenian sport
2009 in Armenian sport
Armenian Hockey League seasons